The Saloli (meaning: Squirrel) is an area of the town of Vasai (Bassein), part of Palghar district of the state of Maharashtra, India comprises the following villages:

Villages 

Atodiwadi
Devalbhat
Prathambahat
Dolbhat
Pholodi
Kaular Wadi
Tiwarbhat
Kharbhat
Sutarbhat
Dhupalwadi
Silshiwadi
Javghar
Naglai
Talai
Agardam
Vaitodi
Bhoronde
Kerlai
Nalai
Levdi
Gunbhat
Patlar
Dhupalwadi
Chavriwadi

Villages in Palghar district